Lava Thomas (born 1958) is an American artist. Thomas was born and raised in Los Angeles.

Career
Thomas' art practice explores female subjectivity, social justice and changing historical discourses.

In 2015 she was selected by the City of San Francisco to create a monument to the writer Maya Angelou. However, the city rescinded its initial approval for the monument, citing objections to Thomas' proposed work by city supervisor Catherine Stefani, who had sponsored the legislation for the artwork. The city started its search for an artist anew, but in 2019 it reversed course and affirmed the original selection of Thomas. The city issued a public apology that stated "Due to our failures, we have caused significant harm to an incredibly talented Black woman artist, and we have caused deep pain to members of the Black artist community."

In 2015 she had a solo exhibition at the Museum of the African Diaspora. In 2018 she exhibited Mugshot Portraits: Women of the Montgomery Bus Boycott, which presented portraits of the women involved in the 1955-1956 Montgomery bus boycott.

Collections
Her work is included in the collections of the Smithsonian American Art Museum, the San Francisco Museum of Modern Art and the Pennsylvania Academy of the Fine Arts.

References

Living people
1958 births
Artists from Los Angeles
Artists in the Smithsonian American Art Museum collection
20th-century African-American women
20th-century African-American artists
21st-century African-American women
21st-century African-American artists
20th-century American women artists
21st-century American women artists